Urakara, often stylized as URAKARA, is a Japanese television drama series from TV Tokyo, first shown in Japan from 14 January 2011.

History
The drama revolves around five characters played by the members of popular South Korean girl group Kara. The members of Kara act as five girls (each with the same name as their real-life selves) who are given missions related to love. The drama is the Japanese acting debut for Kara, although they have previously made cameo appearances as a group in a couple of Korean dramas. Leader Park Gyuri and member Han Seung-yeon had child actress roles in several Korean television series prior to their singing debuts. "Urakara" has also been produced as part of Kara's popularity in Japan since their Japanese debut single "Mister" in 2010.

Cast
 Park Gyuri as Gyuri
 Han Seungyeon as Seungyeon
 Nicole Jung as Nicole
 Goo Hara as Hara
 Kang Jiyoung as Jiyoung
 Mari Hamada as Nozomi Kansai
 Shunsuke Nakamura (ep.1)
 Ken Maeda (ep.10)
 Taiyo Ayukawa (ep.10)

External links
Urakara

2011 Japanese television series debuts
2011 Japanese television series endings
Japanese drama television series
Kara (South Korean group)